Battely is a surname. Notable people with the surname include:

John Battely (1646–1708), English antiquarian and clergyman
Nicholas Battely (1648–1704), English antiquarian and clergyman, brother of John